Suzannah Terry Lessard (born December 1, 1944) is an American writer of literary non-fiction.  She has written memoir, reportorial pieces, essays, and opinion.

Life
Lessard was born in Islip, New York to John Ayres and Alida Mary (White). She is the great-granddaughter of architect Stanford White. She has taught at Columbia School of the Arts, Wesleyan University, The New School, George Mason University, George Washington University, and Goucher College MFA in Creative Non-fiction.

She was one of the first editors of the Washington Monthly from 1971 to 1974.
From 1975 to 1995 she was a staff writer at The New Yorker Magazine She has also published in  New York Times Magazine, Architectural Record, Architectural Digest, and Wilson Quarterly and Harvard Design.

Awards and honors

 1995 Whiting Award
 2003 Mark Lynton History Prize, Mapping the New World: An Inquiry into the Meaning of Sprawl

Fellowships
2001-2002 Fellowship at the Woodrow Wilson International Center for Scholars in Washington D.C.
2002-2003 Jenny McKean Moore Fellowship for creative non-fiction, at George Washington University

Works
 
She is the author of the critically acclaimed memoir, The Architect of Desire: Beauty and Danger in the Stanford White Family (1996).  Her next book, Dreamscape: Finding Our Way in a Time of Epochal Change was, as of fall 2011, in editorial process.   It is a reportorial essay about the experience of going from the Industrial Age to the Information Age with changes in the form and meaning of landscape and place as the point of entry.

Her next book, The View From a Small Mountain: Reading the American Landscape was published in 2017.

In 2019, Lessard published The Absent Hand:Reimagining Our American Landscape which Michael Kimmelman described as “thoughtful, exquisitely written collection of interconnected essays…”

Anthologies

References

External links
"Suzannah Lessard and Honor Moore", BOMB 57, Betsy Sussler, Fall 1996
Profile at The Whiting Foundation

Living people
1944 births
American biographers
American essayists
Date of birth missing (living people)